Austrosimulium is a genus of 31 species of black flies that are distributed in Australia and New Zealand. There are 2 subgenera: Austrosimulium whose species are principally from New Zealand, and Novaustrosimulium which are exclusively Australian. Austrosimulium is a sister genus to the monospecific Paraustrosimulium of South America.

Some species are known to spread the protozoan blood parasite Leucocytozoon tawaki in penguins.

In New Zealand, where they are known as sandflies or namu (in Māori from Proto-Austronesian *ñamuk "mosquito", compare with ), three species – A. australense, A. tillyardianum and A. ungulatum – bite humans.

Species
Subgenus Austrosimulium Tonnoir, 1925
A. albovelatum Dumbleton, 1973
A. alveolatum Dumbleton, 1973
A. australense (Schiner, 1868)
A. bicorne Dumbleton, 1973
A. campbellense Dumbleton, 1973
A. cornutum Tonnoir, 1925
A. crassipes Tonnoir, 1925
A. dugdalei Craig, Craig & Crosby, 2012
A. dumbletoni Crosby, 1976
A. extendorum Craig, Craig & Crosby, 2012
A. fiordense Dumbleton, 1973
A. fulvicorne Mackerras & Mackerras, 1950
A. laticorne Tonnoir, 1925
A. longicorne Tonnoir, 1925
A. mirabile Mackerras & Mackerras, 1948
A. montanum Mackerras & Mackerras, 1952
A. multicorne Tonnoir, 1925
A. stewartense Dumbleton, 1973
A. tillyardianum Dumbleton, 1973
A. tonnoiri Craig, Craig & Crosby, 2012
A. ungulatum Tonnoir, 1925
A. unicorne Dumbleton, 1973
A. vailavoense Craig, Craig & Crosby, 2012
A. vexans (Mik, 1881)
Subgenus Novaustrosimulium Dumbleton, 1973
A. bancrofti (Taylor, 1918)
A. furiosum (Skuse, 1889)
A. magnum Mackerras & Mackerras, 1955
A. pestilens Mackerras & Mackerras, 1948
A. torrentium Tonnoir, 1925
A. victoriae (Roubaud, 1906)
Austrosimulium species as yet unplaced
A. colboi Davies & Györkös, 1988

Literature cited

External links 

 https://web.archive.org/web/20130208160901/http://www.waitakere.govt.nz/AbtCit/ei/EcoWtr/macroinv/macroinvertebrates.asp | page with many Macroinvertebrates listed, described and illustrated

Simuliidae
Culicomorpha genera